Eulamprotes altaicella is a moth of the family Gelechiidae. It was described by Peter Huemer and Ole Karsholt in 2013. It is found in Russia (Altai, Buryatia, Tuva).

References

Moths described in 2013
Eulamprotes